The 1934 Whittier Poets football team was an American football team that represented Whittier College in the Southern California Conference (SCC) during the 1934 college football season. In its fifth season under head coach Wallace Newman, the team compiled a 7–2–1 record (5–0 against conference opponents), won the SCC championship, and outscored opponents by a total of 204 to 81. Its only two losses were on opening day against defending national champion USC and three weeks later against Arizona. The team played its home games at Hadley Field in Whittier, California.

Schedule

References

Whittier
Whittier Poets football seasons
Southern California Intercollegiate Athletic Conference football champion seasons
Whittier Poets football